Tyranny is an album by alternative/punk rock band The Generators, released in 2001.

Critical reception
Exclaim! called the album "a keeper," writing that "melodic elements sneak into songs like 'Coming Down.'"

Track listing
All tracks are written by Doug Dagger; co-writers are noted.

Credits 
Doug Dagger - vocals
Sir Doosky - lead and rhythm guitars, backup vocals
Mike Snow - lead and rhythm guitars, backup vocals
Dirty Ernie - drums, backup vocals
Don Osterberg - bass, backup vocals
Rich Mouser - backup vocals
Bryant Ortega - bass on "All Night Long" and "Dead At 16"

References

The Generators albums
2001 albums